The Saint Pierre and Miquelon national football team is the official football team for Saint Pierre and Miquelon. As an overseas collectivity of France, it is affiliated to the FFF.  Saint Pierre and Miquelon's first official match was an 11–0 defeat to Réunion in the 2010 Coupe de l'Outre-Mer, a competition for teams representing the Overseas departments and territories of France.

CONCACAF membership
Unlike most of the other teams representing French territories in the Western Hemisphere, Saint Pierre and Miquelon is not a member of CONCACAF and therefore does not participate in competitions such as the CONCACAF Gold Cup or CONCACAF Nations League. However, in October 2019 the territory announced its intentions to build a suitable venue and join the organization. It was expected to become a member in September 2022, however they did not join. An official request to CONCACAF had already been submitted by October 2019. League president Herve Huet was then set to meet with CONCACAF president Victor Montagliani in May 2020.

Complete international results
Saint Pierre and Miquelon's first official match was an 11–0 defeat to Réunion in the 2010 Coupe de l'Outre-Mer, a competition for teams representing the Overseas departments and territories of France. Kevin Mathiaud and Xavier Delamaire scored Saint Pierre and Miquelon's first and second-ever goals, respectively, during the 2012 edition of the tournament after the team was held scoreless two years earlier. Despite planning to hold a 2014 competition, the FFF has dissolved the tournament, citing the excessive cost. Saint Pierre and Miquelon has not played an official match since.

Saint Pierre and Miquelon's score is shown first in each case.

Record by opponent

Competitive record

Coupe de l'Outre-Mer

Current squad
This squad was selected for the 2012 Coupe de l'Outre-Mer.

Notable players

  Xavier Delamaire - national team top scorer and most capped player

Player records

References

 
North American national and official selection-teams not affiliated to FIFA
National football teams of Overseas France